WSVS (800 AM) is a classic country and bluegrass formatted broadcast radio station licensed to Crewe, Virginia, serving Southside Virginia.  WSVS is owned and operated by Gee Communications, Inc.

History

WSVS began broadcasting April 4, 1947, on a frequency of 650 kHz.  Formal dedication ceremonies, held April 6, 1947, included transcribed speeches by government officials and broadcasts from the station's studios in Crewe, Blackstone and Farmville. The station was licensed to Southern Virginia Broadcasting Company.

In 1955, WSVS received the Douglas Southall Freeman Award for public service in radio journalism from the Virginia Associated Press Broadcasters. The award was for the station's coverage of three hurricanes, Connie, Diane and Hazel.

The station changed formats to Sports on August 11, 2014, after years as a Classic Country/Bluegrass station.  On October 15, 2014, WSVS changed their format from sports back to Classic Country and Bluegrass.

Translator
In addition to the main station, WSVS is relayed by an FM translator to widen its broadcast area.

References

External links
WSVS official website
FCC History Cards for WSVS

1947 establishments in Virginia
Classic country radio stations in the United States
Radio stations established in 1947
SVS